The Squier Venus (commonly known as Fender Vista Venus) is a signature series guitar released in 1997 and co-designed by Courtney Love in conjunction with Fender's Squier brand, under the Vista series. At the time of its release, Love and Bonnie Raitt were the only two female musicians to have their own signature series of guitars.
 
Its shape was based on Mercury, Stratocaster and Rickenbacker solid-body guitars. It was released in two configurations, six or twelve string (the Venus XII). Colors available included black, sunburst and surf green. Surf green was named after paint code #57 (surf green) from Chevrolet c. 1957. Upon its original release, the Venus retailed for US$699.99 and the Venus XII for $999.99. It was discontinued at the end of 1998. Shirley Manson from Garbage played a custom pink Squier Venus live. 
Ryan Jarman from UK band The Cribs, a friend of Love's, used the surf green version of the guitar as his main instrument between 2011 and 2015.

Controversy 
A man named Tim George of the short-lived Mercury Guitar Company (of Atlanta, GA) has claimed to be the actual designer of the guitar, along with his company co-founder Danny Babbitt. According to George, Babbitt snuck backstage at a Nirvana concert in Atlanta in November 1993 and sold the original custom metallic-green Mercury guitar on which the Venus design was eventually based to Love. Love played this guitar in public extensively over the next several years, and it is the guitar she played in the music video for Hole's song Violet. The 6-string Venus model is virtually identical to Love's Mercury guitar, except with a Fender Stratocaster-like headstock.

Product dating 
The Venus has a one-letter, six-digit serial number printed on the neck of the guitar.  Serial numbers beginning with the letter V were manufactured in 1997.  Serial numbers beginning with the letter A were manufactured between 1997 and 1998.

References

Fender electric guitars